Col Thulani Zungu was a South African Army officer from the artillery.

Military career 

He joined the uMkhonto we Sizwe in 1982 and was trained in Angola. He stayed in exile in Angola, Zambia and returned to South Africa in 1994. He completed Bridging training at Infantry School, Oudtshoorn.He was appointed as an instructor at the School of Arty, staff officer at Army Headquarters, OC of all regular artillery units in Potchefstroom and senior staff officer at the Artillery Formation from 2008. He completed the Joint Senior Staff course in 2005. He left service in 2022

Honours and awards

Medals

References 

South African military officers
Living people
1962 births
UMkhonto we Sizwe personnel
People from Johannesburg